The Wilkins Mill Covered Bridge is north of Rockville, Indiana. The single span Burr Arch Truss covered bridge structure was built by William Hendricks in 1906.

It was added to the National Register of Historic Places in 1978.

History
Solomon Jessup and Zimri Hunt built a mill in 1835 upstream from the bridge site. George Wilkins later opened a store there in 1853 and a carding mill, operated by Solomon Jessup and William Hunt was also built. In 1855 Wilkins bought the mill but later tore it down and built a new one. This is the source of the name Wilkins Mill, however, in 1877 this mill burned down and another mill was built which stood until 1947.

The 1874 Atlas of Parke County shows that the creek was named Mill Creek, but today it is labeled as Sugar Mill Creek. Sugar Mill Creek and Green Creek converge below the bridge and it would seem that after one flood the Sugar Mill Creek changed its course and left the bridge standing over a dry creek bed for a period of time. Looking at satellite picture now show that it appears the bridge is once again crossing water.
 
This was to be the second of three covered bridges built by William Hendricks.

Gallery

See also
 List of Registered Historic Places in Indiana
 Parke County Covered Bridges
 Parke County Covered Bridge Festival

References

External links

Covered bridges on the National Register of Historic Places in Parke County, Indiana
Bridges completed in 1906
Wooden bridges in Indiana
Burr Truss bridges in the United States
1906 establishments in Indiana